Nicky Touli (born ~1996) is a Samoan competitive sailor, who has represented Samoa at the Pacific Games.

Touli is from Vaitele on the island of Upolu. He works as a chef in Fox Glacier, New Zealand.

At the 2019 Pacific Games in Apia he came seventh in the individual Laser Radial, but won gold (alongside Eroni Leilua) in the men's team competition.

References

Living people
People from Tuamasaga
Samoan expatriates in New Zealand
Samoan male sailors (sport)
21st-century Samoan people
Year of birth missing (living people)